Murrow East railway station was a station in Murrow, Cambridgeshire. It was on the Midland and Great Northern Joint Railway line between Wisbech and Peterborough. There was another station in the settlement, Murrow West railway station, on the Great Northern and Great Eastern Joint Railway.

References

External links
 Murrow East station on navigable 1946 O. S. map

Disused railway stations in Cambridgeshire
Former Midland and Great Northern Joint Railway stations
Railway stations in Great Britain opened in 1866
Railway stations in Great Britain closed in 1959
1866 establishments in England
1959 disestablishments in England
Fenland District